The Kahn–Kalai conjecture, also known as the expectation threshold conjecture, is a conjecture in the field of graph theory and statistical mechanics, proposed by Jeff Kahn and Gil Kalai in 2006.

Background 
This conjecture concerns the general problem of estimating when phase transitions occur in systems. For example, in a random network with  nodes, where each edge is included with probability , it is unlikely for the graph to contain a Hamiltonian cycle if  is less than a threshold value , but highly likely if  exceeds that threshold.

Threshold values are often difficult to calculate, but a lower bound for the threshold, the "expectation threshold", is generally easier to calculate. The Kahn–Kalai conjecture is that the two values are generally close together in a precisely defined way, namely that there is a universal constant  for which the ratio between the two is less than  where  is the size of a largest minimal element of an increasing family  of subsets of a power set.

Proof 
In 2022, Jinyoung Park and Huy Tuan Pham released a preprint containing a proposed proof of the conjecture. The proof has been praised for its elegance and conciseness.

References

See also 
 Percolation theory

Conjectures
2000s in mathematics
2020s in mathematics
Graph theory
Statistical mechanics